Alpenus schraderi is a moth of the  family Erebidae. It was described by Walter Rothschild in 1910. It is found in Ethiopia, Sudan, Kenya, Uganda and Tanzania.

The larvae feed on Amaryllis belladonna, Averhoa carambola, Albizzia zygia, Canavalia ensiformis, Musa sapientum and Theobroma cacao.

Subspecies
Alpenus schraderi schraderi (Ethiopia)
Alpenus schraderi rattrayi (Rothschild, 1910) (Sudan, Kenya, Uganda, Tanzania)

References

Moths described in 1910
Spilosomina
Moths of Africa
Insects of Cameroon
Insects of West Africa
Insects of Uganda
Insects of Eritrea
Insects of Ethiopia
Insects of Tanzania